The 2022 Copa CONMEBOL Libertadores was the 63rd edition of the CONMEBOL Libertadores (also referred to as the Copa Libertadores), South America's premier club football tournament organized by CONMEBOL.

On 14 May 2020, CONMEBOL announced the candidate venues for the 2021, 2022 and 2023 club competition finals. On 13 May 2021, CONMEBOL's Council decided that the final would be played at the Estadio Monumental Isidro Romero Carbo in Guayaquil, Ecuador on 29 October 2022.

On 25 November 2021, CONMEBOL announced the abolition of the away goals rule in all of its club competitions including the Copa Libertadores, which had been used since 2005. Accordingly, if in a two-legged tie two teams scored the same amount of aggregate goals, the winner of the tie would not be decided by the number of away goals scored by each team but by a penalty shoot-out.

Brazilian club Flamengo were the champions, winning their third Copa Libertadores title after beating fellow Brazilian side Athletico Paranaense in the final by a 1–0 score. As winners of the 2022 Copa Libertadores, Flamengo earned the right to play against the winners of the 2022 Copa Sudamericana in the 2023 Recopa Sudamericana and also automatically qualified for both the  2022 FIFA Club World Cup and the 2023 Copa Libertadores group stage.

Palmeiras were the defending champions, but were eliminated by Athletico Paranaense in the semi-finals.

Teams
The following 47 teams from the 10 CONMEBOL member associations qualified for the tournament:
Copa Libertadores champions
Copa Sudamericana champions
Brazil: 7 berths
Argentina: 6 berths
All other associations: 4 berths each

The entry stage is determined as follows:
Group stage: 28 teams
Copa Libertadores champions
Copa Sudamericana champions
Teams which qualified for berths 1–5 from Argentina and Brazil
Teams which qualified for berths 1–2 from all other associations
Second stage: 13 teams
Teams which qualified for berths 6–7 from Brazil
Team which qualified for berth 6 from Argentina
Teams which qualified for berths 3–4 from Chile and Colombia
Teams which qualified for berth 3 from all other associations
First stage: 6 teams
Teams which qualified for berth 4 from Bolivia, Ecuador, Paraguay, Peru, Uruguay and Venezuela

Schedule
The schedule of the competition was as follows:

Draws

Qualifying stages

First stage

Second stage

Third stage

Group stage

Group A

Group B

Group C

Group D

Group E

Group F

Group G

Group H

Final stages

Qualified teams
The winners and runners-up of each of the eight groups in the group stage advanced to the round of 16.

Seeding

Bracket

Round of 16

Quarter-finals

Semi-finals

Final

Statistics

Top scorers

Team of the tournament 
The CONMEBOL technical study group selected the following 11 players as the team of the tournament.

See also
2022 Copa Sudamericana

References

External links
CONMEBOL Libertadores 2022, CONMEBOL.com
CONMEBOL Libertadores

 
2022
1